Austin Robert Smith (born 1982) is an American poet and fiction writer. Smith is one of three sons of Dan and Cheryl Smith, and he grew up on a farm north of Freeport, Illinois. Smith's father, Dan Smith, also wrote poetry and has been described as a "farmer-poet."

Smith has published two books of poetry, both in the Princeton Series of Contemporary Poets, and three poetry chapbooks. His poems have appeared in journals including The New Yorker, Poetry, and Virginia Quarterly Review, and his short fiction has appeared in journals including Kenyon Review, Sewanee Review, and ZYZZYVA.

Smith has been awarded a Stegner Fellowship at Stanford University, a Creative Writing Fellowship from the National Endowment for the Arts, and the Amy Lowell Poetry Travelling Scholarship. He holds a BA from the University of Wisconsin–Madison, an MA from the University of California, Davis, and an MFA from the University of Virginia.

Smith's poetry deals with themes including rural life, violence, and war. Originally from rural Illinois, the poet often expresses a strong tie to the Midwestern United States. As Smith wrote in 2018, "I feel it's even more important than ever to write of this region, to identify the trends that have led to the decline of small towns and small family farms, and to celebrate the people and the land so that no reader of mine will ever think of the Midwest as flyover country again."

Smith's works have been reviewed in publications including the New York Times, Publishers Weekly, the Washington Post, WBUR's Here and Now, and Yale Review.

Bibliography

References

External links
 Smith's personal website
 University of Dubuque Archway Reading Series: Austin Smith, 15 November 2019 (YouTube)

American male poets
American poets
Poets from Illinois
Stegner Fellows
21st-century American poets
National Endowment for the Arts Fellows
University of California, Davis alumni
University of Virginia alumni
University of Wisconsin–Madison alumni
21st-century American male writers
1982 births
Living people